Kannamma is a 2015 Indian-Tamil-language soap opera starring Sonia, Pollachi Babu, Kiruthika, Rajasekhar and Sumangali. It aired Monday through Friday 20:00 (IST) on Kalaignar TV from 2 November 2015 through 29 April 2016.

Plot
Kannamma story revolves around the one family and the family Kannamma (Sonia) how she face all the problem without a husband and get a good solution.

Cast
 Sonia as Kannamma
 Pollachi Babu as Srinivas
 Kiruthika
 Rajasekhar
 Sumangali
 Jasak
 Azhaku
 Niranjani Ashok as Inspector Aaradhana

Airing history 
The show started airing on Kalaignar TV on 2 November 2015 and It aired on Monday through Friday 9:30PM (IST). Later its timing changed, Starting from Monday 4 January 2016, the show was shifted to 8:00PM (IST) time Slot.

References

External links
 

Kalaignar TV television series
2015 Tamil-language television series debuts
Tamil-language television shows
2016 Tamil-language television series endings
2010s Tamil-language television series